Ceta may refer to:

 Četa, an armed band of the Balkans
 Anton Çeta (1920–1995), Albanian academic
 Ceta Ramkhalawansingh, Canadian politician

CETA may refer to:
 Comprehensive Economic and Trade Agreement
 Comprehensive Employment and Training Act
 CETA Artists Project (NYC)

See also 
 Cheta (disambiguation)
 Seta (disambiguation)